Revenge! is a 1971 American made-for-television horror-thriller film directed by Jud Taylor and starring Shelley Winters, Bradford Dillman and Stuart Whitman. The film premiered as the ABC Movie of the Week on November 6, 1971.

Plot
Shelley Winters stars as Amanda Hilton, a deranged and vengeful mother who imprisons in a cage in her basement the man (Bradford Dillman) she believes is responsible for the seduction and suicide of her daughter. She tortures him mercilessly in her hostile revenge.

Cast

Reception

References

External links

1971 television films
1971 films
1970s horror thriller films
American horror thriller films
ABC Movie of the Week
Films directed by Jud Taylor
Films scored by Dominic Frontiere
Films with screenplays by Joseph Stefano
1971 horror films
American horror television films
1970s American films